Wolstonbury Hill is a  biological Site of Special Scientific Interest south-west of in West Sussex. It is owned by the National Trust and part of it is a Scheduled Monument.

Description
Views across the Weald to the north are panoramic, to the east are the Clayton Windmills and Ditchling Beacon beyond. Hollingbury is prominent to the southeast. Looking west one can see Newtimber Hill, West Hill with Devils Dyke just beyond, further out Chanctonbury Ring is clearly visible.

Wolstonbury, owned and maintained by the National Trust, is listed as a Scheduled Monument.

Access
No roads or car parks lie close to the summit so visitors have to ascend on foot or by mountain bike.

Geology
South of Hurstpierpoint ridge, the clay vale lies beneath the jutting profile and complex scarp and foot of Wolstonbury Hill.

The approach from the north is characterised by a network of linked or closely spaced woodlands (some parts ancient) centred on the designed landscape at Danny House.

Flora and fauna

Archeology and history
The remains at the site include a  early Bronze Age enclosure now referred to as Wolstonbury C. A possible inner enclosure known as Wolstonbury A appears to be older, due to it being overlain by C. Wolstonbury B is another possible enclosure sandwiched between A and C, its presence indicated by a survey conducted in 1994 by the Royal Commission on the Historical Monuments of England. Excavations done by Bournemouth University in 1995 suggest that Wolstonbury A and B may be field lynchets.

Skeletons were reportedly unearthed during flint digging operations begun in 1765. This digging continued until the mid-19th century, resulting in extensive damage to the site. Unknown quantities of Neolithic and early Bronze Age flintwork were discovered in a 1929 dig as well as "Romano-British" pottery, animal bones, and hammerstones.

References

External links 
 http://www.wolstonbury.com
 https://www.nationaltrust.org.uk/saddlescombe-farm-and-newtimber-hill/features/wolstonbury-hill

Geology of England
Hills of West Sussex
Sites of Special Scientific Interest in West Sussex
National Trust properties in West Sussex